Pleš is a remote settlement in the Municipality of Kočevje in southern Slovenia. The area is part of the traditional region of Lower Carniola and is now included in the Southeast Slovenia Statistical Region. Its territory is now part of the village of Borovec pri Kočevski Reki.

History
Pleš was listed in the land registry of 1498 as having a full farm; in the land registry of 1574 the farm had been divided into two halves. Pleš gradually grew into a settlement with six houses. In 1971 Pleš had only one house, located about 100 m west of the road to Kočevska Reka.

References

External links
Pleš on Geopedia
Pre–World War II map of Pleš with oeconyms and family names

Former populated places in the Municipality of Kočevje